North Taunton is an unofficial neighborhood in the city of Taunton, Massachusetts. It is not a census-designated area, but is considered by local residents as a municipally designated populated region of the city.

Location 
North Taunton is located in the northern portion of the city and is bordered by the Whittenton, Whittenton Junction, and Oakland neighborhoods to the south, the towns of Raynham to the east, Norton to the west, and Easton to the north.

Transportation 
Interstate 495 is the only major route that cuts through the neighborhood in a northwest–south east direction. Bay Street is the main access road connecting the neighborhood to the Whittenton neighborhood and the rest of the city.

Geography 
A large portion of the Hockomock Swamp Wildlife Management Area is located the northern portions of North Taunton. Lake Sabbatia is the largest body of water in the area and is the source of the Mill River which runs through the downtown region of Taunton. Near the Sabbatia Lake is the Watson Pond State Park

Neighborhoods in Massachusetts
Populated places in Bristol County, Massachusetts
Taunton, Massachusetts